Colbert is an English and French surname and given name of uncertain etymology. It is possible that it appeared independently several times throughout history. The name is recorded in England in the 11th century Domesday Book in Devon, Cheshire, and Lincolnshire. This English surname was originally a given name that may have meant "cool" and "bright"; see also Bert.

The name is common in English-speaking countries, particularly Ireland, but some of these families may have their origin in France, where the name is very common.

The French name perhaps has a different origin, but some linguists say it has the same origin from the Germanic words kol ("cool") and berht ("bright"). It is recorded in the French province of Champagne in the 15th century, where, some suggest, it is a reduced form of "Colibert", which is also attested in medieval Champagne. "Colibert" was originally a contraction of the Latin  ("fellow freedman", i.e. "fellow freed slave"). It may, however, derive from an unattested Germanic given name *Colberht, or a gallicized form of the Flemish surname Koelbert. This in turn derives from a given name mentioned as Colobert in the 7th century.

List of people

Surname

A–E
 Adrian Colbert (born 1993), American football player
 Annie Colbert (born 1982), Editor—in-Chief, Popular Science
 Anthony Colbert (1934–2007), British illustrator and painter
 Benjamin Colbert (born 1961), British-based American academic
 Brad Colbert (born 1974), United States Marine and subject of Generation Kill
 Burwell Colbert (1783–c.1850), American slave of Thomas Jefferson who was held in high esteem by Jefferson as a "faithful servant" who was "absolutely excepted from the whip" and served as butler, personal valet, glazier, and painter at Monticello
 Charles Colbert, marquis de Croissy (1625–1696), French diplomat, brother of Jean-Baptiste Colbert
Charlotte Colbert, Franco-British multi-media artist
 Chunk Colbert (died 1874), American Old West gunman
 Claudette Colbert (1903–1996), Oscar-winning French-American actress
 Cleveland Colbert (1906–1962), African American politician and activist
 Con Colbert (1896–1916), Irish rebel
 Craig Colbert (born 1965), American baseball player
 Danny Colbert (born 1950), American football player
 Darrell Colbert (born 1964), American football player
 Edwin H. Colbert (1905–2001), American vertebrate paleontologist
 Elizabeth Colbert Busch (born 1954), American politician

F–M
 George Colbert (c. 1764–1839), also known as Tootemastubbea, leader of the Chickasaw, soldier and a plantation owner in Mississippi
 Gregory Colbert (born 1960), Canadian photographer and filmmaker
 Holmes Colbert (fl. 1812–1850s), developer of the Chickasaw Nation's constitution in the 1850s
 J. Frank Colbert (1882–1949), Louisiana politician
 Jacques-Nicolas Colbert (1655–1707), French churchman, son of Jean-Baptiste Colbert
 James Colbert (1890–1970), Irish politician and farmer
 James William Colbert Jr. (1920–1974), American physician and father of Stephen Colbert
 Jean-Baptiste Colbert (1619–1683), an important Comptroller-General of Finances under the French king Louis XIV
 Jean-Baptiste Colbert, Marquis de Seignelay (1651–1690), called Seignelay, French politician, son of Jean-Baptiste Colbert
 Jean-Baptiste Colbert, Marquess of Torcy (1665–1746), French diplomat who negotiated important treaties
 Jim Colbert (born 1941), American golfer
 John Colbert (1946–2011), birth name of American singer J. Blackfoot
 Keary Colbert (born 1982), American football player
 Kevin Colbert (born 1957), American football general manager
 Lehmon Colbert (born 1988), American professional basketball player
 Leigh Colbert (born 1975), Australian rules footballer
 Leo Otis Colbert (1883–1968), American admiral, third Director of the United States Coast and Geodetic Survey Corps
 Levi Colbert (1759–1834), also known as Itawamba, leader and chief of the Chickasaw in the American Southeast
 Michael Colbert (1900–1959), Irish politician
 Michael B. Colbert, director of the Ohio Department of Job and Family Services

N–Z
 Nate Colbert (1946–2023), American baseball player
 Patrick Colbert (1842–1877), Irish soldier who served in the United States Navy during the American Civil War
 Pierre David de Colbert-Chabanais (1774–1853), Napoleonic French Baron and leader of the Red Lancers
 Philip Colbert, British artist and fashion designer
 Richard Colbert, American spammer
 Richard G. Colbert (1915–1973), four-star admiral, U.S. Navy
 Robert Colbert (born 1931), American television actor and star of The Time Tunnel
 Serge Colbert (born 1972), American composer
 Stephen Colbert (born 1964), American satirist and entertainer, host of The Colbert Report and The Late Show with Stephen Colbert
 Thomas J. Colbert (born 1957), American consultant, writer, producer and former media executive
 Tom Colbert (born 1949), American judge
 Vince Colbert (born 1945), American baseball player
 Will Colbert (born 1985), Canadian ice hockey player

Given name
 Colbert Clark (1898–1960), American screenwriter, film director and film producer
 Colbert Coldwell, American founder of Coldwell Banker real estate company
 Colbert I. King (born 1939), American journalist
 Colbert Marlot (born 1963), French professional footballer
 Colbert Searles (1873–1947), American football coach

Characters
 Stephen Colbert (character), fictionalized persona of political satirist Stephen Colbert
 Will Colbert (Friends character), character on Friends portrayed by Brad Pitt

See also
 Colbert (disambiguation)

References

French-language surnames
Surnames of Irish origin